Kinango Constituency is an electoral constituency in Kenya. It is one of four constituencies in Kwale County. The constituency has nine wards, all electing councillors for the Kwale County Council. The constituency was established for the 1988 elections.

It is not to be confused with Kinangop Constituency in Nyandarua County.

Members of Parliament

Locations and wards

References

External links 
Map of the constituency

Constituencies in Kwale County
Constituencies in Coast Province
1988 establishments in Kenya
Constituencies established in 1988